Destry is a 1954 American western film directed by George Marshall and starring Audie Murphy, Mari Blanchard, Lyle Bettger and Thomas Mitchell.

This, the third film to utilise the title character of Max Brand's novel Destry Rides Again, is a color remake of the black-&-white 1939 Marlene Dietrich and James Stewart film version. Indeed, Halliwell's Film Guide calls it an "almost scene-for-scene remake." Both films were directed by George Marshall and have a plot bearing no resemblance to Brand's novel or the original 1932 film adaptation.

Plot

The sheriff (Trevor Bardette) of a small western town dies of a 'heart attack' and the crooked mayor, The Honorable Hiram J. Sellers (Edgar Buchanan), and leading crook Phil Decker (Lyle Bettger) appoint the town drunk, Reginald T. "Rags" Barnaby (Thomas Mitchell), as the new sheriff, believing that he will be easily controlled by them. Rags, however, immediately announces he is giving up drinking and refuses to accept Decker as his new deputy, telling them that he has someone else in mind: Tom Destry, the son of a famed two-fisted lawman.

Destry (Audie Murphy) arrives on the stagecoach with great fanfare, but Rags is disappointed to find out that unlike his father the son is a young man who refuses to carry a gun. Destry prefers friendly persuasion and use of the law over violence. Destry finds out that the previous sheriff may not have died of a heart attack as had been claimed; he suspects that the sheriff was murdered while trying to resolve a land dispute, and he sets about finding out how the sheriff actually died. After Decker orchestrates a public display of humiliation, with the help of his girlfriend Brandy (Mari Blanchard), against the new deputy, Destry tricks them into unloading their weapons and then surprises them all: while he prefers non-violence, he is expertly proficient with a gun, turning the tables on the perceived sentiment against him with an impressive sharp-shooting display. All the while his public bravado was merely a cover to collect evidence for analysis.

Eventually it becomes clear that Decker shot & killed the sheriff in order to further his plans to obtain all the land necessary to control and exploit the transit of cattle over those properties. With the help of gunfighter Jack Larson (Alan Hale Jr.), who had earlier come to blows with Destry but ultimately comes to a respectful accord with the new deputy, arrests from Decker's gang are made and it seems evident that Decker will be arrested for the murder. However a jailbreak is committed, on Decker's orders, and Barnaby is killed in the jail. Destry finally abandons his resolve to seek orderly resolution and heads to the saloon with gun in hand. A shootout follows, in which Decker, his gang, the mayor and even Brandy (who sacrifices herself to save Destry) are killed. With law and order restored, Destry is appointed the new sheriff.

Cast
 Audie Murphy as Tom Destry
 Mari Blanchard as Brandy 
 Lyle Bettger as Decker
 Thomas Mitchell as Rags Barnaby
 Edgar Buchanan as Mayor Sellers
 Lori Nelson as Martha Phillips
 Wallace Ford as Doc Curtis
 Mary Wickes as Bessie Mae Curtis
 Alan Hale Jr. as Jack Larson
 George Wallace as Curly 
 Richard Reeves as Mac
 Walter Baldwin as Henry Skinner
 Lee Aaker as Eil Skinner
 Anthony Lawrence as Professor (as Mitchell Lawrence)
 Frank Richards as Dummy 
 Trevor Bardette as Sheriff Bailey
 Ralph Peters as Bartender
 John Doucette as Coward

References

External links

 
Destry at Audie Murphy Memorial Site

1954 films
1954 Western (genre) films
Audie Murphy
American Western (genre) comedy films
1950s Western (genre) comedy films
Films scored by Henry Mancini
Films scored by Frank Skinner
Films scored by Herman Stein
1954 comedy films
Shot-for-shot remakes
Universal Pictures films
Films based on American novels
1950s English-language films
1950s American films